Cengiz Umut Meraş (born 20 December 1995) is a Turkish professional footballer who plays as a left-back for Beşiktaş.

Club career
On 31 August 2018, Meraş moved to Bursaspor after a couple successful seasons with Boluspor. The transaction costed a reported amount of TRY2.25m. Meraş made his Süper Lig debut for Bursaspor against İstanbul Başakşehir, ending 0–0, on 21 September 2018.

In August 2019, Meraş joined Ligue 2 side Le Havre AC on a four-year contract and played for two seasons.

In August 2021, Meraş returned to Süper Lig by signing to Beşiktaş.

International career
Meraş made his debut for the Turkey national team on 30 May 2019, in a friendly against Greece, as a starter.

Statistics

International

Honours
Beşiktaş
Süper Kupa: 2021

References

External links
 
 
 
 

1995 births
Living people
People from Eminönü
Turkish footballers
Association football fullbacks
Turkey international footballers
UEFA Euro 2020 players
Süper Lig players
TFF First League players
Ligue 2 players
Bursaspor footballers
Boluspor footballers
Le Havre AC players
Beşiktaş J.K. footballers
Turkish expatriate footballers
Expatriate footballers in France
Turkish expatriate sportspeople in France